Moths of Japan represent over 6,000 known moth species. The moths (mostly nocturnal) and butterflies (mostly diurnal) together make up the taxonomic order Lepidoptera.

This page provides a link to detailed lists of moth species which have been recorded in Japan, including the Japanese common names.

Lists based on superfamilies
List of moths of Japan (superfamilies Micropterigoidea to Yponomeutoidea): Micropterigoidea: Micropterigidae, Eriocraniidae, Hepialidae; Nepticuloidea: Nepticulidae, Opostegidae; Incurvarioidea: Heliozelidae, Adelidae, Prodoxidae, Incurvariidae; Tischerioidea: Tischeriidae; Tineoidea: Tineidae, Galacticidae, Psychidae, Amphitheridae; Gracillarioidea: Bucculatricidae, Gracillariidae; Yponomeutoidea: Yponomeutidae, Ypsolophidae, Plutellidae, Acrolepiidae, Glyphipterigidae, Heliodinidae, Bedelliidae, Lyonetiidae.
List of moths of Japan (superfamily Gelechioidea): Gelechioidea: Ethmiidae, Depressariidae, Elachistidae, Parametriotidae, Deuterogoniidae, Xyloryctidae, Scythrididae, Chimabachidae, Schistonoeidae, Oecophoridae, Stathmopodidae, Lecithoceridae, Batrachedridae, Coleophoridae, Momphidae, Blastobasidae, Autostichidae, Peleopodidae, Cosmopterigidae, Gelechiidae.
List of moths of Japan (superfamilies Zygaenoidea to Tortricoidea): Zygaenoidea: Epipyropidae, Limacodidae, Zygaenidae; Sesioidea: Brachodidae, Sesiidae; Cossoidea: Cossidae; Tortricoidea: Tortricidae.
List of moths of Japan (superfamilies Choreutoidea to Thyridoidea): Choreutoidea: Choreutidae; Schreckensteinioidea: Schreckensteiniidae; Epermenioidea: Epermeniidae; Alucitoidea: Alucitidae; Pterophoroidea: Pterophoridae; Immoidea: Immidae; Hyblaeoidea: Hyblaeidae; Copromorphoidea: Carposinidae, Copromorphidae; Thyridoidea: Thyrididae.
List of moths of Japan (superfamilies Pyraloidea to Drepanoidea): Pyraloidea: Pyralidae, Crambidae; Calliduloidae: Callidulidae; Drepanoidea: Epicopeiidae, Drepanidae.
List of moths of Japan (superfamilies Bombycoidea and Geometroidea): Bombycoidea: Lasiocampidae, Eupterotidae, Bombycidae, Saturniidae, Brahmaeidae, Sphingidae; Geometroidea: Uraniidae, Geometridae.
List of moths of Japan (superfamily Noctuoidea): Noctuoidea: Notodontidae, Lymantriidae, Arctiidae, Nolidae, Pantheidae, Noctuidae.

See also
List of butterflies of Japan

External links
A revision of the Japanese species of the family Bucculatricidae (Lepidoptera)
 
 
Adalbert Seitz Ed. Die Großschmetterlinge der Erde, Verlag Alfred Kernen, Stuttgart
Band 1: Abt. 1, Die Großschmetterlinge des palaearktischen Faunengebietes, Die palaearktischen Tagfalter, 1909
Band 2: Abt. 1, Die Großschmetterlinge des palaearktischen Faunengebietes, Die palaearktischen Spinner und Schwärmer, 1912–1913
Band 3: Abt. 1, Die Großschmetterlinge des palaearktischen Faunengebietes, Die palaearktischen eulenartigen Nachtfalter, 1914
Band 4: Abt. 1, Die Großschmetterlinge des palaearktischen Faunengebietes, Die spannerartigen Nachtfalter, 1915
All  online in English here BHL and Plates in the German edition

 01

Japan
Japan